Alfonso García de Vinuesa (13 December 1958 – 24 May 1997) was a Spanish racing driver from Madrid.

Racing career
De Vinuesa made his professional racing debut in 1984 in the European Formula Three Championship driving for Eddie Jordan Racing at the last race of the season, at Jarama, where he unexpectedly qualified third.

In 1985 he made four German Formula Three Championship starts for Josef Kaufmann Racing and finished 24th in points. In 1986 he made seven German F3 starts for Malte Bongers Motorsport, won once and finished seventh in points. He also made his International Formula 3000 debut for Peter Gethin Racing.

In 1987 he returned to International F3000 full-time for BS Automotive but was injured in the third race of the season at Circuit de Spa-Francorchamps. The concussion he sustained at Spa was underestimated and when he made his come-back he wasn't the same anymore and wasn't as quick as he had previously been.

He returned later in the season for two races but failed to make the field in both of them. The single point he scored in the first race was good enough for 19th in points.

In 1988 he returned to F3000 for Onyx Racing but failed to qualify for the first three races of the season and left the team. He returned for three races with Tamchester Racing but failed to qualify for two of them and failed to finish the one he made. He was entered in the final two races of the season for Madgwick International but failed to qualify for both of those as well. These would be de Vinuesa's final professional racing appearances.

Personal life and death
De Vinuesa had a tragic life outside of racing. His first love died in a skiing accident. After his racing career ended he founded an advertising agency but his largest client went bankrupt in 1994 and the company shut down. His brother committed suicide in 1993. His first marriage ended in divorce and when he was engaged again in April 1997, his fiancée was killed in a traffic accident. Alfonso Garcia de Vinuesa was killed little more than a month later when he was hit by a truck on a highway in Madrid when he was checking his car for a mechanical problem.

Racing record

Complete International Formula 3000 results
(key) (Races in bold indicate pole position; races in italics indicate fastest lap.)

References

1958 births
1997 deaths
Spanish racing drivers
FIA European Formula 3 Championship drivers
German Formula Three Championship drivers
International Formula 3000 drivers
Road incident deaths in Spain
Sportspeople from Madrid
Josef Kaufmann Racing drivers